The  1938 German football championship, the 31st edition of the competition, was won by Hannover 96, the club's first-ever German championship, by defeating Schalke 04 4–3 after extra time in the final. The 1938 final had to be replayed because the first game had ended in a three-all draw after extra time. For Hannover 96 it marked the first of two national championships, the second coming in 1954, while, for Schalke, it was a short setback in the club's most successful era, having won the 1934, 1935 and 1937 final and going on to win the 1939, 1940 and 1942 ones as well.

The 1938 edition was only the second, after 1922, when a replay of the final was required. FC Schalke 04 entered the final as heavy favourites, having won the national championship in the previous season. In the first game Schalke twice took the lead, 2–0 and 3–1 before Erich Meng equalised in the 87th minute. No goals were scored in extra time, making a replay necessary. The second game, one week later, saw Hannover take the lead before Schalke went ahead twice again only for Hannover to equalise once again in the 87th minute. In the following extra time Erich Meng scored the decisive goal in the 117th minute, giving Hannover its first national title. Erich Meng, who, together with his brother Richard, played a big part in the title win for Hannover, was killed in action less than two years later in the Second World War.

Hamburger SV's Gustav Carstens was the 1938 championships top scorer, with nine goals.

The sixteen 1937–38 Gauliga champions competed in a group stage of four groups of four teams each, with the group winners advancing to the semi-finals. The two semi-final winners then contested the 1938 championship final.

From the following season, the German championship expanded to eighteen clubs and continued to increase in numbers through a combination of territorial expansion of Nazi Germany and the sub-dividing of the Gauligas. In later years, the number of Gauligas reached a strength of thirty one in its last completed season, 1943–44.

Qualified teams
The teams qualified through the 1937–38 Gauliga season:

 SV Beuel 06 was retrospectively awarded the championship in the Gauliga Mittelrhein but this decision was made too late to replace Alemannia Aachen in the German championship.

Competition

Group 1
Group 1 was contested by the champions of the Gauligas Nordmark, Pommern, Südwest and Ostpreußen:

Group 2
Group 2 was contested by the champions of the Gauligas Baden, Brandenburg, Mitte and Westfalen:

Group 3
Group 3 was contested by the champions of the Gauligas Niederrhein, Schlesien, Sachsen and Württemberg:

Group 4
Group 4 was contested by the champions of the Gauligas Bayern, Hessen, Mittelrhein and Niedersachsen:

Semi-finals

|align="center" style="background:#ddffdd" colspan=3|29 May 1938

|}

Third place play-off

|align="center" style="background:#ddffdd" colspan=3|26 June 1938

|}

Replay

|align="center" style="background:#ddffdd" colspan=3|3 July 1938

|}

Final

|align="center" style="background:#ddffdd" colspan=3|26 June 1938

|}

Replay

|align="center" style="background:#ddffdd" colspan=3|3 July 1938

|}

References

Sources
 kicker Allmanach 1990, by kicker, page 164 & 177 - German championship

External links
 German Championship 1937–38 at weltfussball.de 
 German Championship 1938 at RSSSF

1
German
German football championship seasons